Interstellar Low Ways is an album recorded by the American jazz musician Sun Ra and his Myth Science Arkestra, mostly recorded in Chicago, 1960, and released in 1967 on his own El Saturn label. Originally titled Rocket Number Nine, the album had acquired its present name, and the red-on-white sleeve by Claude Dangerfield, by 1969. The album is known particularly for the two songs featuring chants, "Interplanetary Music" and "Rocket Number Nine Take off for the Planet Venus". These would stay in the Arkestra's repertoire for many years:

When reissued by Evidence, Interstellar Low Ways was included as the second half of a CD that also featured the whole of Sun Ra and his Solar Arkestra Visits Planet Earth.

Lady Gaga references the line; "Rocket Number Nine Take off for the Planet Venus" in her song "Venus".

Marathon sessions at the RCA Studios
Most of the tracks were recorded at a marathon session tracking between 30 and 40 songs, either at RCA Studios, or possibly The Hall Recording Company (both in Chicago), around 17 June 1960. Other albums to include tracks from the session include Fate In A Pleasant Mood, Holiday for Soul Dance, Angels and Demons at Play and We Travel the Space Ways.

A single, "Space Loneliness" b/w "State Street", was released shortly after the recording sessions. Whilst "State Street" was never released on an album by Ra, it was copyrighted as part of the "Space Loneliness" suite ("Space Loneliness: A Sound Concerto") along with Fate In A Pleasant Mood & Lights on a Satellite, July 8, 1960. This single was followed up by another 7" from the session, "The Blue Set" b/w "Big City Blues", which wasn't included on any of the Saturn-released Chicago albums.

Trumpeter Phil Cohran later remembered the reaction "Space Loneliness" got when played on a local radio station:

The Wonder Inn, Chicago
It was around this time, June 1960, that their manager, Alton Abraham, secured the band a solid booking—their first since the Queen's Mansion gigs—playing first Wednesdays and then five nights a week at the Wonder Inn, 75th & Cottage Grove, Chicago. Originally billed as 'a special added attraction' for July 30, 1960 featuring Sun Ra and his 'recording band', Alton Abraham celebrated the engagements by acquiring for the band the entire wardrobe from a local opera company—heavily stocked with capes, puffed sleeves and doublets—that had been discarded after performing William Tell; from here on in, the whole band started to dress for 'Space'. The engagement, lasting until early 1961, 'has justly become legendary'.

On other nights the Arkestra would wear 'purple blazers, white gloves, and beanies with propellers on top that lit up', and would set off robots with flashing lights and wind-up flying saucers into the audience.

Track listing

12" Vinyl
All songs were written by Sun Ra.
Side A:
"Onward" - (3.31)
"Somewhere in Space" - (2.56)
"Interplanetary Music" - (2.24)
"Interstellar Low Ways" - (8.23)
Side B:
"Space Loneliness" - (4.30)
"Space Aura" - (3.08)
"Rocket Number Nine Take off for the Planet Venus" - (6.14)

Musicians
On Interstellar Low Ways, March 6, 1959;
Sun Ra - Gong
Hobart Dotson - Percussion
Marshall Allen - Flute
James Spaulding - Flute
John Gilmore - Tenor Sax, percussion
Pat Patrick - Percussion
Ronnie Boykins - Bass
William Cochran - Drums

On Space Loneliness, Somewhere In Space, Interplanetary Music, and Rocket Number Nine, recorded at the RCA Studios, Chicago, around June 17, 1960;
Sun Ra - Piano
Phil Cohran - Cornet
Nate Pryor - Trombone
Marshall Allen - Alto Sax, Flute, Bells
John Gilmore - Tenor Sax, Percussion
Ronnie Boykins - Bass, Space Gong
Jon Hardy - Drums, percussion, gong
Ensemble vocals

On Onward and Space Aura, recorded during rehearsals, Chicago around October 1960;
Sun Ra - Piano
George Hudson - Trumpet
Marshall Allen - Alto Sax, Bells
John Gilmore - Tenor Sax, Percussion
Ronnie Boykins - Bass, percussion
Jon Hardy - Drums

References

Sun Ra albums
1960 albums
El Saturn Records albums
Evidence Music albums